Dick Wilcox (born 6 August 1944) is a former  Australian rules footballer who played with South Melbourne in the Victorian Football League (VFL).

Notes

External links 

Living people
1944 births
Australian rules footballers from Victoria (Australia)
Sydney Swans players
University Blacks Football Club players